Rothsville is an unincorporated community and census-designated place (CDP) in Warwick Township, Lancaster County, Pennsylvania, United States. The population was 3,044 at the 2010 census. Lititz is the town for residents' mailing addresses.

History 
Rothsville was founded in 1790 by Philip Roth, an early settler and tavern keeper.

Geography
Rothsville is located in northern Lancaster County, in the eastern part of Warwick Township. Pennsylvania Route 772 is the community's Main Street; the highway leads west  to Lititz and southeast  to U.S. Route 222 in Brownstown.

Cocalico Creek and its tributary Hammer Creek form the northeast boundary of Rothsville (as well as the border with Ephrata Township), and Lititz Run forms the southwest boundary. Cocalico Creek and Lititz Run are tributaries of the Conestoga River, which flows southwest to the Susquehanna.

Transportation
Pennsylvania Route 772, in part the old Mount Hope-Newport Road, runs through the town.

The Reading Railroad operated passenger service from its station outside the town on Rothsville Station Road until 1952. The Warwick to Ephrata Rail Trail now runs on the route of the old railroad through the north side of Rothsville between active sections of the line in Lititz and Ephrata.

Demographics
At the 2000 census there were 3,017 people, 1,038 households, and 852 families living in the CDP. The population density was 1,221.1 people per square mile (471.6/km2). There were 1,060 housing units at an average density of 429.0/sq mi (165.7/km2).  The racial makeup of the CDP was 95.86% White, 0.33% African American, 1.29% Asian, 0.70% from other races, and 1.82% from two or more races. Hispanic or Latino of any race were 2.92%.

There were 1,038 households, 46.6% had children under the age of 18 living with them, 71.6% were married couples living together, 7.3% had a female householder with no husband present, and 17.9% were non-families. 13.9% of households were made up of individuals, and 3.3% were one person aged 65 or older. The average household size was 2.91 and the average family size was 3.21.

The age distribution was 32.2% under the age of 18, 6.8% from 18 to 24, 34.0% from 25 to 44, 20.9% from 45 to 64, and 6.0% 65 or older. The median age was 34 years. For every 100 females, there were 100.3 males. For every 100 females age 18 and over, there were 94.2 males.

The median household income was $52,694 and the median family income  was $54,000. Males had a median income of $38,953 versus $25,000 for females. The per capita income for the CDP was $18,535. About 5.2% of families and 5.5% of the population were below the poverty line, including 7.0% of those under age 18 and 6.0% of those age 65 or over.

References

Census-designated places in Lancaster County, Pennsylvania
Census-designated places in Pennsylvania